was a Japanese manga artist in Kure, Hiroshima Prefecture, Japan, and best known for the creation of the Sukeban Deka franchise in 1979.

History
When Hakusensha published Sukeban Deka in 1979, Wada's work became very popular. He was commissioned to create the OAV series and a TV series that spawned three seasons, including two live-action movies.

As of 2007, he had been involved in creating his latest manga Crown. He was previously involved in creating Sukeban Deka: Codename = Asamiya Saki. Wada died in July 2011 due to ischaemic heart disease.

Works

Manga
Author and artist unless otherwise noted.
 Ai to Shi no Sunadokei (1971-1973, Bessatsu Margaret, Shueisha)
 Waga Tomo Frankenstein (1972-1975, Bessatsu Margaret, Shueisha)
 Gin'iro no Kami no Arisa (1973, Bessatsu Margaret, Shueisha)
 Daitōbō (1974, Bessatsu Margaret, Shueisha)
 Hidari no Me no Akuryō (1975, Hana to Yume, Hakusensha)
 Midori Iro no Sunadokei (1975, Monthly Comics Mimi, Kodansha)
 Vanilla Essence no Gogo (1975, Hana to Yume, Hakusensha)
 Chōshōjo Asuka (1975-2000, Margaret (Shueisha), Hana to Yume (Hakusensha), and Comic Flapper (Media Factory))
 Arabian Kyōsōkyoku (1976, Princess, Akita Shoten)
 Kuma-san no Shiki (1976, Bessatsu Margaret, Shueisha)
 Sukeban Deka (1976-1982, Hana to Yume, Hakusensha)
 Asagi Iro no Densetsu (1976-1990, LaLa and Hana to Yume, Hakusensha)
 Ramu-chan no Sensō (1978, Princess, Akita Shoten)
 Pygmalio  (1978-1990, Hana to Yume, Hakusensha)
 Kyōfu no Fukkatsu (1980, Princess, Akita Shoten)
 Ninja Hishō (1980-2002, Hana to Yume (Hakusensha), Monthly ComiComi (Hakusensha), Duo, Comic Flapper (Media Factory))
 Cabbage Batake o Tōri Nukete (1982, Petit Apple Pie, Tokuma Shoten)
 Kaitō Amaryllis (1991-1995, Hana to Yume, Hakusensha)
 Shōjozame (1996-1999, Hana to Yume, Hakusensha)
 Lady Midnight (2001-2002, Mystery Bonita, Akita Shoten)
 Kugutsushi Rin (2006-current, The Puppet Master Rin, Akita Shoten)

Collaborative manga
 Kami ni Se o Muketa Otoko (1992–1994, art by Shōko Hamada, Serie Mystery, Hakusensha)
 White Dragon (1997–1998, art by Yū Kinutani, Comic Nora, Gakken)
 Blaze (1999–2000, art by Sakaki Hashimoto, Mystery Bonita, Akita Shoten)
 Crown  (2005–2008, art by You Higuri, Princess, Akita Shoten)
 Norowareta Kotō

Anime
 Crusher Joe (OAV, special guest designer on Goby)
 Pygmalio (original creator)

TV
 Sukeban Deka (OAV, original creator)
 Sukeban Deka (series 1–3, original creator)
 Sukeban Deka (movie, original creator)
 Sukeban Deka: Kazama Sanshimai no Gyakushuu (original creator)
 Sukeban Deka: Codename = Asamiya Saki (original creator)

References

External links
 
 
 Shinji Wada Manga works list

1950 births
2011 deaths
People from Kure, Hiroshima
Manga artists from Hiroshima Prefecture